A Hundred Days Off is the sixth album by Underworld. The album produced two UK Singles Chart entries: "Two Months Off", which reached no. 12 and "Dinosaur Adventure 3D", which reached no. 34. Although this was the first album since Darren Emerson's departure from the group in 2001, the album is not a huge stylistic makeover as the main focus of the band is still trance, techno, and house, although without the thumping beats that defined their previous album Beaucoup Fish. Instead, the album explores more of an ambient and experimental music style.

Critical reception
A Hundred Days Off received generally positive reviews from music critics. It has a score of 71/100 on Metacritic based on 18 reviews indicating as "generally favorable reviews". NME gave the album 8/10 describing it as "Their best album since their Dubnobasswithmyheadman debut, Karl and Rick have pulled off a comeback in fine style and laid some demons to rest" and also stating that "Underworld prove that you're only as old as the technology you use". Rolling Stone gave the album 3 out of 5 stars saying that "The beauty of A Hundred Days Off is that it pumps and churns so suggestively; it somehow evokes the blues of the otherwise successful modern man, who goes out every night and dances alone in his head". Uncut gave the album 4 out of 5 stars saying it is "A very fine album--Underworld don't make any other kind...a beautiful and baffling enigma."

Promo version
In the Spring of 2011, an alternate version of the album was distributed by a fan who was previously unaware that it was not widely heard. This version of the album was called "Ansum", and was apparently an early un-mastered cut of the album burned onto a CD-R for internal use at V2. Most of the tracks are very similar, if not identical, to the final album version; however, the track order is changed; "Little Speaker" is omitted; "Mo Move" is doubled in length and shares its second half with a re-worked version of the b-side "Ansum";  "Twist" contains an extended drum outro; and "Ballet Lane" and "Trim" contain minor percussion differences.

Track listing

Promo version track listing

Charts

Certifications

References

2002 albums
Underworld (band) albums
V2 Records albums